Swedish Landrace may refer to:

Swedish Landrace goat, a breed of goat
Swedish Landrace pig, a breed of pig